"The First Word in Memory Is Me" is a song written by Pat Bunch, Pam Rose and Mary Ann Kennedy, and recorded by American country music artist Janie Fricke.  It was released in December 1984 as the second single from the album The First Word in Memory.  The song reached #7 on the Billboard Hot Country Singles & Tracks chart.

Chart performance

References

1985 singles
1985 songs
Janie Fricke songs
Songs written by Pam Rose
Songs written by Mary Ann Kennedy (American singer)
Song recordings produced by Bob Montgomery (songwriter)
Songs written by Pat Bunch
Columbia Records singles